The Brian Kilrea Coach of the Year Award is given out annually to the coach of the year in the Canadian Hockey League (CHL).  Originally called the CHL Coach of the Year Award, the trophy was renamed in 2003 to honour Brian Kilrea when he won his 1,000th game as the coach of the Ottawa 67's. Kilrea has won more games than any other coach in Canadian junior hockey history, two Memorial Cup championships and was inducted into the Hockey Hall of Fame in 2003. He was named the OHL's top coach five times in his 32-year coaching career, and won the CHL Coach of the Year Award once, in 1996–97.

The winner is named from one of the recipients of the Coach of the Year Award in the CHL's three constituent leagues: the Matt Leyden Trophy (Ontario Hockey League Coach of the  Year), the Ron Lapointe Trophy (Quebec Major Junior Hockey League Coach of the Year), or the Dunc McCallum Memorial Trophy (Western Hockey League Coach of the Year). Bob Lowes, Bob Boughner and Gerard Gallant are the only coaches to capture the award twice.

Winners

See also
List of Canadian Hockey League awards

References

External links
 CHL Awards – CHL

Canadian Hockey League trophies and awards
Canada